R-mount may refer to:
 Canon R lens mount, used on Canon SLR cameras produced from 1959 to 1964
 Leica R lens mount, used on Leica R-series SLR cameras produced from 1976 to 2009

See also
 Canon RF mount, used on Canon's EOS R mirrorless camera introduced in 2018